These are the official results of the Men's Javelin Throw event at the 1997 World Championships in Athens, Greece. There were a total number of 40 participating athletes, with the final held on Tuesday 5 August 1997. The qualification mark was set at 83.00 metres.

Medalists

Schedule
All times are Eastern European Time (UTC+2)

Abbreviations
All results shown are in metres

Records

Qualification

Group A

Group B

Final

See also
 1992 Men's Olympic Javelin Throw (Barcelona)
 1994 Men's European Championships Javelin Throw (Helsinki)
 1996 Men's Olympic Javelin Throw (Atlanta)
 1998 Men's European Championships Javelin Throw (Budapest)
 2000 Men's Olympic Javelin Throw (Sydney)

References
 Results
 koti.welho

J
Javelin throw at the World Athletics Championships